Theropithecus oswaldi is an extinct species of Theropithecus from the early to middle Pleistocene of Kenya, Ethiopia, Tanzania, South Africa, Spain, Morocco and Algeria. It appears to have been a specialised grazer. The species went extinct in South Africa around 1.0 Ma. Having existed alongside hominins like Homo erectus, it is likely that conflict with early humans played a role in their extinction as a site has been found with many juveniles butchered.

Description 
It is remarkable for its large size compared to other old world monkeys. Postcranial fossils found of this species are much greater in size than extant papionins, including the mandrill.

References

Papionini
Pleistocene mammals of Africa
Pleistocene mammals of Europe
Prehistoric monkeys
Pleistocene primates
Fossil taxa described in 1916